Ayaya may refer to:

 Aya Matsuura, Japanese singer and actress
 Aya Komichi (Ayaya), a character from Kin-iro Mosaic anime and manga series
 Guajá language, also known as Ayaya
 "Mamacita (Ayaya)", a song of South Korean band Super Junior